Gnaeus Acerronius Proculus was a consul of the Roman Empire in 37 AD, with Gaius Petronius Pontius Nigrinus as his colleague; that was the year Tiberius died. 

Proculus is possibly a descendant of the Cn. Acerronius whom Cicero mentions in his oration for Tullius, Pro Tullio, from 71 BC, as a vir optimus. He may also have been the father of Acerronia Polla, a friend of Agrippina the Younger, whom the emperor Nero had murdered in AD 59.

See also
 Acerronia (gens)

References

Imperial Roman consuls
1st-century Romans
Acerronii